Events in the year 1951 in the People's Republic of China.

Incumbents 
 Chairman of the Chinese Communist Party – Mao Zedong
 Chairman of the Government – Mao Zedong
 Vice Chairmen of the Government – Zhu De Liu Shaoqi, Song Qingling, Li Jishen, Zhang Lan, Gao Gang
 Premier – Zhou Enlai
 Vice Premiers – Dong Biwu, Chen Yun, Guo Moruo, Huang Yanpei

Governors  
 Governor of Fujian Province –  Zhang Dingcheng 
 Governor of Gansu Province – Deng Baoshan
 Governor of Guangdong Province – Ye Jianying 
 Governor of Guizhou Province – Yang Yong 
 Governor of Hebei Province – Yang Xiufeng 
 Governor of Heilongjiang Province – Yu Yifu  
 Governor of Henan Province – Wu Zhipu 
 Governor of Hubei Province – Li Xiannian   
 Governor of Hunan Province – Wang Shoudao  
 Governor of Jiangsu Province – Tan Zhenlin 
 Governor of Jiangxi Province – Shao Shiping 
 Governor of Jilin Province – Zhou Chiheng 
 Governor of Qinghai Province – Zhao Shoushan
 Governor of Shaanxi Province – Ma Mingfang 
 Governor of Shandong Province – Kang Sheng 
 Governor of Shanxi Province – Pei Lisheng then Lai Ruoyu 
 Governor of Yunnan Province – Chen Geng 
 Governor of Zhejiang Province – Tan Zhenlin

Events
 January 4 – Korean War: Chinese and North Korean forces capture Seoul.
 February 1 – Korean War: The United Nations General Assembly declares that the People's Republic of China is an aggressor in the Korean War in United Nations General Assembly Resolution 498.
 April 23-June 10 – Korean War: Chinese and North Korean forces launch the Fifth Phase Campaign. The resulting Chinese defeat at Seoul and Soyang River brought the Communists side to the armistice negotiation.
 May 23 – The Tibetan government signs the Seventeen Point Agreement for the Peaceful Liberation of Tibet with the People's Republic of China.
 September 9 – Chinese communist forces move into Lhasa, the capital of Tibet.

Births
 October 30 – Liu Xiaoqing, Chinese actress and businesswoman.

Deaths

See also 
 1951 in Chinese film

References 

 
Years of the 20th century in China
China